Xylia xylocarpa is a species of tree in the mimosoid clade of the subfamily Caesalpinioideae of the family Fabaceae.

Description and properties
This perennial tree is very conspicuous in the flowering season owing to its bright yellow flowers.

Xylia xylocarpa produces hardwood, and in Vietnam it is classified as an 'ironwood' with its name referring to use in traditional cart-making. The cross-section of a trunk has a distinctive yellowish-white and thick outer layer, with a crimson-dark core of fine grain and high density (1.15 with 15% moisture content). The wood pulp may be used for making wrapping paper.

The seeds of this tree are edible. This tree is considered a medicinal plant in India. In Thailand its leaves are used to treat wounds in elephants.

Distribution and common names
It has also been planted in certain parts of East Africa.Xylia xylocarpa (Roxb.) This species, naturally adapted to conditions in Thailand, is used in reforestation at certain denuded or environmentally degraded areas of the country.

Gallery

References

External links
 พืชกินได้ในป่าสะแกราช Daeng - Description and pictures
 Karnataka Forest Department

xylocarpa
Flora of the Indian subcontinent
Trees of Indo-China
Fabales of Asia